Bastards is a 2013 thriller film directed by Claire Denis. It stars Vincent Lindon and Chiara Mastroianni. It was screened in the Un Certain Regard section at the 2013 Cannes Film Festival.

Plot
Marco Silvestri is an oil tanker captain who works abroad and now has little contact with his sister, who is married to his best friend, Jacques, in Paris. He is divorced and his two daughters live with their mother in the Vendee.

His sister, Sandra, asks him to return after her husband commits suicide, which he does, giving up his job. It emerges that Sandra and her husband’s women’s shoe manufacturing business, inherited from the father of Marco and Sandra (Marco gave them his share of the inheritance), faces bankruptcy. Also, Sandra’s daughter, Justine, has a history of drugs, alcohol and self-harming and is in hospital with internal injuries from sexual abuse and torture. The doctor is considering an operation but Justine wants to leave the hospital. Also the rape of his niece, Justine.
Sandra blames an off the books major creditor, Edouard Laporte, a wealthy businessman, for her husband’s death, although Marco notes that the product quality was poor, and feels guilty for allowing Laporte to use her daughter as a sexual object.

Marco moves into an apartment in the same block as Laporte, in a smart area, and has an affair with Laporte’s younger wife, Raphaëlle. He leaves his flat unfurnished and sells his watch, life insurance policy and car to pay the other creditors. Sandra gives him their father’s handgun and says that he will need it.

Sandra arranges for them to visit a farm building used for sex parties. After making a large payment, the pimp and prostitute who organise the parties let him in and he finds a bloodied corncob. He assaults the manager. Later, two men attack him outside his apartment. He attempts to ambush Laporte, but Laporte does not appear.

Justine runs away from hospital. Sandra did not want the police to be involved but they later find Justine wandering naked. She escapes again, hiding with the sex party manager and the prostitute. The sex manager sells Marco images of her arriving at the sex club with Edouard and her father. Later, Justine crashes their car, killing them and badly injuring herself.

Discovering Raphaëlle and Marco are sleeping together, Edouard leaves her, taking their young son, saying he does not mind the cheating but does not want their son involved with Marco and his family. When he returns to collect some of his son's things, Marco tries to stop him. Marco is shot and killed with his own gun by Raphaëlle. Sandra receives a video in the mail which she watches with Justine's doctor. It is a recording of a sex party involving Edouard, Justine, her father, and a prostitute. The tape shows a fully clothed Edouard watching while Justine's naked father looms over her, holding a corn cob.

Cast

Production
The film's title derives from Akira Kurosawa's film The Bad Sleep Well, whose French title Les salauds dorment en paix translates literally to Bastards Sleep in Peace. For the film, Claire Denis also took inspiration from William Faulkner's novel Sanctuary. It is Denis' first feature film that was shot digitally. Filming took place in Paris over the course of 8 weeks.

Release
The film had its world premiere in the Un Certain Regard section at the 2013 Cannes Film Festival on 21 May 2013. It was released in France on 7 August 2013, and in Germany on 26 December 2013.

Reception
On review aggregator website Rotten Tomatoes, the film holds an approval rating of 65% based on 48 reviews, and an average rating of 6.6/10. On Metacritic, the film has a weighted average score of 69 out of 100, based on 17 critics, indicating "generally favorable reviews".

Slant Magazine ranked the film #99 on its list of the best films of the 2010s.

References

External links
 

2013 films
2013 thriller films
2010s French-language films
2010s English-language films
French thriller films
German thriller films
Films directed by Claire Denis
Films set in Paris
Films shot in Paris
Incest in film
2010s French films
2010s German films